Flamengo Park, also known as Aterro do Flamengo, Eduardo Gomes Park, and Aterro do Brigadeiro Eduardo Gomes, is the largest public park and recreation area within the city of Rio de Janeiro, in eastern Brazil, and the largest urban park by the sea in the world. 

The park is located along Guanabara Bay, in the Flamengo district of the city, between Downtown Rio and Copacabana.

Design
Flamengo Park was envisioned by Lota de Macedo Soares, while conceived and designed by Affonso Eduardo Reidy with Modernist park gardens and civic landscapes designed by world-renowned landscape designer and artist Roberto Burle Marx. The 296 acres (120 ha) park was completed in 1965.

Features
Flamengo Park is the location of the Rio de Janeiro Museum of Modern Art, the Carmen Miranda Museum, and the Monument to the Dead of World War II with Modernist memorial sculptures.

Sports
Flamengo Park has a strong sports tradition, with many different outdoor recreational facilities available.

The park is the start off and return location of various marathons in the city. It provides a main segment for Rio's Cycling Race, a Latin American event that allots the largest number of points on the Union Cycliste Internationale (UCI) world ranking.

2007 Pan American Games

In the 2007 Pan American Games, Marina da Glória was the main venue for the Rio 2007 Sailing competitions. Also during the Games, the Marathon (men's and women's) arrival points were set up at the Flamengo Park, which also staged the Race Walking and Cycling Road competitions.

References

External links

Parks in Rio de Janeiro (city)
Urban public parks
Gardens in Brazil
Sports venues in Rio de Janeiro (city)
Venues of the 2007 Pan American Games
Modernist architecture in Brazil